Gordon Lee Walgren (March 7, 1933 – March 13, 2018) was an American lawyer and politician.

Walgren was appointed to the Washington House of Representatives in November 1966 and served the remaining term in 1966. Walgren served in the Washington State Senator from 1967 to 1980, and was Senate Majority Leader from 1975 onward. Though he was convicted of racketeering prior to the 1980 election, he still won the primary election.

He was born in Bremerton, Washington and graduated from Bremerton High School. He earned a Business and Doctor of Law degrees from the University of Washington.

Walgren was convicted of mail fraud, racketeering, and violations of the Travel Act. Two of the three counts - mail fraud and racketeering - were later overturned.

Walgren was a lawyer and businessman. In 2013, Walgren published his memoir: Close To The Flames. Walgren died at his home on March 13, 2018.

References 

1933 births
2018 deaths
People from Bremerton, Washington
Democratic Party members of the Washington House of Representatives
Democratic Party Washington (state) state senators
University of Washington School of Law alumni
Businesspeople from Washington (state)
Washington (state) lawyers
Writers from Washington (state)
Politicians convicted under the Travel Act
Washington (state) politicians convicted of crimes
University of Washington Foster School of Business alumni
20th-century American businesspeople
20th-century American lawyers